Saragi is a 2007 Sri Lankan Sinhala adult drama film directed by Louie Vanderstraeten and produced by Jude Muttiah. It stars Ravindra Irugal Bandara and Nilu Hettihewa in lead roles along with Sudath Dodangoda and Laxman Arachchige. Music composed by Nino Leon. It is the 998th Sri Lankan film in the Sinhala cinema.

Plot

Cast
 Ravindra Irugal Bandara
 Nilu Hettihewa
 Sudath Dodangoda
 Laxman Arachchige
 Gamini Kumara
 Madhu Jayaweera
 Vasantha Kumaravila
 Roshini Fernando

References

2002 films
2000s Sinhala-language films
2002 drama films
Sri Lankan drama films